Sir Nicholas Maxted Fenn  (19 February 1936 – 18 September 2016) was a British diplomat. He was High Commissioner to India from 1991 to 1996.

Fenn served as a RAF pilot in the 1950s before his diplomatic and civil service career. Fenn later studied at Cambridge University.

He lived in Marden, Kent.

Career

Fenn entered the Foreign Office in 1959 and worked as secretaries at various posts overseas, spokesperson at the FCO and as counselor at the British Embassy in Peking. Fenn was fluent in Burmese after undergoing training in 1960 and assigned to Burma in the early 1960s.

Fenn's ambassadorships included Rangoon (1982-1986) and Dublin (1986-1991). Fenn retired in 1996. Following his career with the diplomatic service Fenn served as Chief Executive of Marie Curie, from 1997 to 2000, after retiring as Chief Executive he continued to serve the charity as Chair of its council of trustees until 2006.

From 1972 to 1975 he was with the Energy Department (as Deputy Head) in the Foreign Office and at the Royal College of Defence Studies in 1978.

References

 

1936 births
2016 deaths
Knights Grand Cross of the Order of St Michael and St George
Ambassadors of the United Kingdom to Ireland
High Commissioners of the United Kingdom to India
Ambassadors of the United Kingdom to Myanmar
People from Marden, Kent